Tebogo Monyai (born 22 September 1979 in Tzaneen) is a former South African association football defender.

International career
On 11 March 2010 Monyai was first called up for the Bafa Bafana for the Africa Cup of Nations 2012 qualification match against Botswana national football team on 13 March 2010.

References

1979 births
South African soccer players
South Africa international soccer players
Living people
Moroka Swallows F.C. players
University of Pretoria F.C. players
Mpumalanga Black Aces F.C. players
People from Tzaneen
Winners Park F.C. players
Association football defenders
Sportspeople from Limpopo